Lemhi could refer to:

People
Lemhi Shoshone, a band of Shoshone in Idaho
Limhi, a king mentioned in the Book of Mormon

Places
Fort Lemhi, a fort built by Mormon missionaries in 1855
Lemhi, Idaho, an unincorporated community
Lemhi County, Idaho
Lemhi County Airport, a public airport located south of Salmon, Idaho
Lemhi National Forest, in Idaho
Lemhi Pass, pass in the Rocky Mountains between Idaho and Montana
Lemhi River, a tributary of the Salmon River in Idaho
National Register of Historic Places listings in Lemhi County, Idaho

Other
Lemhi Gold, a thoroughbred racehorse